The BMW F650CS was a standard motorcycle made by BMW Motorrad from 2001 to 2005.  CS stood for city/street, as it was aimed at urban commuters and it was also known as the Scarver, a portmanteau of street and carver. The CS was the third generation in the F650 single series, after the 1993–2001 F650, and 2000–7 F650GS. It was known for its offbeat styling intended to attract new motorcyclists.

Design
The F650CS was designed by American David Robb, Vice President of BMW Motorrad Design from 1993 to 2012, 
and designer of the R1100RT, K1200RS, R1200C, R1100S and K1200LT. The bike was the result of a partnership between BMW and Aprilia.

Many elements of the design, such as the striking colors used for the coordinated body panels, the Space Age instrument panel, translucent passenger grab handles, and slickly serviceable storage compartment had a consumer appliance feel and appearance, "remind[ing] you of current computer peripherals such as HP ScanJet printers." Its small transparent wind screen seemed "iMac-inspired", and the use of translucent polycarbonate elsewhere hinted at Apple's style at the time. The addition of superfluous oblong slots with incongruous rubber inserts along the sides of the aluminum frame led Rider magazine to quip that it was "overstyled". BMW "ripped a page from the strategy book of Apple Computer Inc" with its three "youth-oriented" color choices, azure blue metallic, golden orange metallic and beluga blue.

To help attract the fashion conscious buyer, the F650CS had special color options for the side panels, either to match the other body panels or in aluminum, and a choice of two seat colors, for a total of 24 permutations. This modularity extended to the multi-use top storage compartment, which came with a small removable soft bag, and was used for an optional larger soft shoulder bag, or a hard plastic case which could have added an audio system with a CD player. The ignition key matched all three different locking compartment options, and the audio system was integrated with the speedometer so that it automatically increased the music volume at higher speeds and increased the bass at low speed.

While the F650CS was similar to the GS released in 2000, it had several unique features including a single-sided swingarm, toothed belt drive, modular soft case baggage, and a storage area in what would traditionally be the top tank of the bike. The fuel tank was instead placed underneath the rear half of the seat, with the fuel filler cap on the right hand side of the rear of the bike.

Traditionally, BMW has favored shaft drive, but for the first time chose belt drive for this application for its advantages in cost and weight over shaft drive, and because it did not require the frequent cleaning, lubrication, and adjustment of roller chain drive, as well as lasting longer than a chain and running quieter. Using belt drive was consistent with the intent to attract new motorcyclists who might not be comfortable with the mechanical chores normally associated with motorcycling. Though belt drives have greater power loss than chains, which are typical of high-performance motorcycles, they do not suffer from chain lash, since chains must be kept slightly loose but belts remain tight at all times, meaning the responsiveness of the drivetrain is comparable to a heavier and more costly shaft drive.

Performance
The Rotax single-cylinder engine was low-powered compared to the liter class superbikes that could be had for the same price at the time, but considered on its own merits the bike's  (rear wheel) was more than adequate for spirited riding in an urban setting, and the  rear wheel torque allowed for easy acceleration when maneuvering in traffic. Testers found the handling light and quick, and surprisingly enjoyable in low-speed twisties and canyon curves.

Sales
Initial press reaction among motorcycle critics was uniformly positive, particularly praising BMW for taking a bold and innovative risk, and for their willingness to break traditional molds and entice consumers other than the typical motorcycle rider, though they worried that the cachet of the BMW label would not be enough to justify the premium price. It appeared at a time when most motorcycles were increasing in horsepower and specialization, and the F650CS went against those marketing trends, aimed instead at urban commuters, non-traditional riders, new motorcyclists, women, and shorter riders. The model was one example of BMW's efforts to combat becoming too much of an "old man's brand", and expand beyond their famous touring machines into new markets. The bike's designer David Robb said that, "If we want to offer something to new people we have to offer something new." The large storage space and ease of use suggested the F650CS could attract scooter commuters as well as motorcyclists. BMW estimated 40% of sales would come from non-motorcyclists. It was BMW's first entry-level motorcycle since the R65 of 1978–1984. The F650CS was derived from the dual-sport F650GS single, which was BMW's top selling model worldwide in 2001.

In its Canadian advertising campaign, the bike was tied with images of extreme sports in unlikely locales, like snowboarding down Mount Everest and windsurfing whitecaps in the Pacific Ocean, accompanied by lines such as "You feel the urge to windsurf across the Pacific Ocean... but what you really need is a ride on the new F650CS." Hendrik von Kuenheim, president and CEO of BMW Group explained that, "These riders want a bike that expresses their individuality and expands on their already exciting lifestyle." Ads were placed in lifestyle magazines rather than specialty motorcycle magazines.

But for the year 2002, Motorcyclist magazine described the F650CS's sales as an "unmitigated flop", which languished alongside other lightweight European motorcycles that consumers found too expensive outside their home markets. Three years later, in 2005, the F650CS was discontinued, and the F800 series was introduced in 2006, but it was a different class of motorcycle, aimed at the middleweight sport bike segment, for riders looking to upgrade from their first bike, or return to motorcycling, rather than the beginning motorcyclist market. The F800 had a straight-twin engine, not a single, and though it shared belt drive with the F650CS and boasted its own technical innovations, it did not push the design envelope with the kind of unusual features found on the CS, nor did it elicit commentary for the polarizing nontraditional styling the CS was noted for.

See also
List of motorcycles by type of engine

Notes

F650CS
Belt drive motorcycles
Standard motorcycles
Motorcycles introduced in 2001